Atrichius is a genus of Scarabaeidae or scarab beetles in the superfamily Scarabaeoidea.

References

Scarabaeidae